Tayon Fleet-Davis (born November 19, 1998) is an American football running back who is currently a free agent. He played for the Kansas City Chiefs of the National Football League (NFL) and played college football at Maryland.

Early life
Tayon Fleet-Davis was born in Oxon Hill, Maryland. He was a running back for Potomac.

College career
On July 30, 2016, Fleet-Davis committed to the University of Maryland and enrolled on July 1, 2017. During his career at Maryland, Fleet-Davis rushed for 1,343 yards and 15 touchdowns. During the 2021 season, Davis was named a redshirt. After the 2021 Pinstripe Bowl, Davis declared for the 2022 NFL Draft.

Professional career

After going unselected in the 2022 NFL Draft, Fleet-Davis was signed by the Kansas City Chiefs as an undrafted free agent on April 30, 2022. He was waived on August 27, 2022.

References

External links
 Kansas City Chiefs
 Maryland Terrapins bio

Living people
American football running backs
Maryland Terrapins football players
Players of American football from Maryland
1998 births